Museum of Imaging Technology is a museum in Pathum Wan District, Bangkok, Thailand. It is located in Faculty of Science, Chulalongkorn University.

External links
 Museum of Imagery Technology - official site

Museums in Bangkok
University museums in Thailand
Chulalongkorn University
Photography museums and galleries in Thailand